Arambagh Municipality is the civic body that governs Arambag and its surrounding areas in Arambagh subdivision of Hooghly district, West Bengal, India.

History
Arambagh Municipality was established in 1886.

Geography

Arambagh Municipality covers an area of 117.20 sq km and has a total population of 66,175 (2011).

Healthcare
Arambagh Subdivisonal Hospital, with 250 beds, is located in the Arambagh Municipality area.

Elections
In the 2022 municipal elections for Arambagh Municipality Trinamool Congress won 18 seats and BJP won 1 seat

In the 2015 municipal elections for Arambagh Municipality Trinamool Congress won all 19 seats.

In the 2010 municipal elections for Arambagh Municipality Trinamool Congress won 9 seats, CPI (M) 7 seats, Forward Bloc 1 seat and Independent 1 seat.

About the 2010 municipal elections, The Guardian wrote, "Today's municipal elections are unlike any for decades: the Communists, who have held West Bengal's main towns almost without a break since the 1970s, are facing disaster… This time defeat is likely to be definitive and could signal the beginning of the end for the Communist Party of India-Marxist (CPIM)."

In the 2005 municipal elections for Arambagh Municipality, CPI (M) won 11 seats, CPI 1 seat, Forward Bloc 3 seats and others 3 seats.

References

 

Municipalities of West Bengal